"My Oh My" is a song by the British rock band Slade, released in 1983 as the second single from the band's eleventh studio album The Amazing Kamikaze Syndrome, and in 1984 as the second single from the album's US counterpart Keep Your Hands Off My Power Supply. The song was written by lead vocalist Noddy Holder and bassist Jim Lea, and produced by John Punter. It reached No. 2 in the UK and was also the band's second Top 40 hit in America, where it reached No. 37.

Background
Having recorded much of The Amazing Kamikaze Syndrome in 1982, Slade's label RCA felt the album lacked chart potential and in the effort to amend that, RCA suggested the band work with producer John Punter. Holder and Lea then wrote and demoed two songs; "My Oh My" and "Run Runaway". Both were received with enthusiasm by RCA and Punter was hired to work on the two tracks. "My Oh My" was released in November 1983 and reached No. 2 in the UK over the Christmas period. Following the UK/European success of "My Oh My", The Amazing Kamikaze Syndrome was rush-released by RCA in December. In January 1984, "My Oh My" was certified UK Gold by BPI. In Sweden, the song topped the chart and was awarded Platinum for sales in excess of 50,000.

The 1983 success of Quiet Riot's version of Slade's 1973 UK chart topper "Cum On Feel the Noize" led to Slade signing with CBS for their first American record deal since the 1970s. The label soon repackaged The Amazing Kamikaze Syndrome into Keep Your Hands Off My Power Supply and released "Run Runaway" as the lead single in March 1984. It was Slade's breakthrough hit in America, reaching No. 20, and was followed-up in June by "My Oh My". It gave the band their second and last Top 40 hit there, peaking at No. 37 on the Billboard Hot 100 and also reached No. 32 on the Billboard Top Tracks Chart.

The idea for the melody of "My Oh My" came to Lea while the band were in the dressing room prior to a concert in Wales. Listening to Holder and guitarist Dave Hill tuning up. Lea later recalled: "It reminded me of bagpipes. I wrote the melody in my head to the drone of the strings." In a 1987 fan club interview, Hill chose "My Oh My" as his favourite Slade single: "Although I didn't like "My Oh My" when I first heard it, by the time I started playing on it and promoting it, I discovered a certain magic and hidden power in it."

Swing version
In 1985, a swing-style version of the song was recorded, which appeared as the B-side to the band's 1985 single "Do You Believe in Miracles". The version was recorded by the Monty Babson Big Band with Holder adding his vocals to it. In a 1986 fan club interview, Holder spoke of the version:

Release
"My Oh My" was released on 7" and 12" vinyl by RCA Records in the UK, Ireland, across Europe, Brazil, Mexico, South Africa, Australia, New Zealand and Japan. It was released by CBS in America and Canada. The B-side on all RCA versions of the single was "Keep Your Hands Off My Power Supply", which was originally exclusive to the single. The 12" vinyl, released in the UK, Germany and Mexico, featured an extended version of "My Oh My" as the A-side and a second B-side "Don't Tame a Hurricane", which again was initially exclusive to the single. Both B-sides would appear as album tracks on the Keep Your Hands Off My Power Supply album. On the CBS releases, the album track "High and Dry" appeared as the B-side. In the UK, a limited edition 7" vinyl was also released, containing an additional track "Merry Xmas Everybody (Live & Kickin')", which had previously appeared as the B-side to the band's 1982 single "(And Now the Waltz) C'est La Vie".

Promotion
In the UK, the band performed the song on various TV shows, including Top of the Pops, The Saturday Show, The Russell Harty Show, Saturday Superstore and David Frost's End of the Year Show. In February 1984, the band mimed the song at the BBC British Rock and Pop Awards. For its 1984 release in America, the band performed the song on American Bandstand.

A music video was filmed to promote the American release of the single. It was directed by Keith Coe and shot in London. The video depicts Slade walking in the countryside and one by one get picked up by an articulated lorry driven by a racing driver, which has an open stage on the back. The band are seen performing the song on the lorry, which arrives at Surrey Docks for a concert, where schoolchildren are seen waving Slade scarves, the lorry driver joins the band on stage, takes their crash helmet off and reveals themselves to be a beautiful woman.  Like the "Run Runaway" video, "My Oh My" received regular airings on MTV.

Critical reception
In a review of The Amazing Kamikaze Syndrome, Record Mirror described the song as "trembling" and "the best thing they've done for years". In Smash Hits, Jools Holland reviewed the single, stating that it sounded like a "slowed-down version of "She'll Be Coming Round the Mountain" with a football team singing at the end". Cash Box listed the single as one of their "feature picks" during July 1984. They noted the song's focus on melody, Holder's "heartfelt lead vocal" and the piano intro that "leads into Slade's classic power-rock sound".

Formats
7" Single (RCA release)
"My Oh My" - 4:09
"Keep Your Hands Off My Power Supply" - 3:34

7" Single (UK limited edition)
"My Oh My" - 4:09
"Merry Xmas Everybody (Live & Kickin')" - 3:28
"Keep Your Hands Off My Power Supply" - 3:34

7" Single (CBS release)
"My Oh My" - 4:09
"High and Dry" - 3:10

7" Single (CBS promo)
"My Oh My" - 4:09
"My Oh My" - 4:09

12" Single (RCA release)
"My Oh My" - 5:30
"Keep Your Hands Off My Power Supply" - 3:34
"Don't Tame a Hurricane" - 2:30

12" Single (CBS promo)
"My Oh My" - 4:11
"Run Runaway" - 4:59

Chart performance

Cover versions
 In 1984, Swedish dansband Ingmar Nordströms recorded an instrumental version featuring saxophone for their album Saxparty 11.
 In 1984, German "NDW-band" Combo Colossale released a German version "Eis und Feuer (My-Oh-My)" on Repertoire Records.
In 1985, the song was parodied by American comedian Joe Piscopo on his album New Jersey. Imitating U.S. talk host David Letterman, he sings "We're having some fun now, my, oh my. We're having more fun now than humans should be allowed... phone the neighbors, wake the kids..."
 In 1995, Norwegian band Hurra Torpedo recorded a cover for their single "Stockholm".
 In 1996, German rock band Extrabreit released a cover of the song on their album Jeden Tag - Jede Nacht. The song was titled "Das Ruder" and featured extra writing credit to Kai Havaii and Stefan Kleinkrieg for the German lyrics.
 In 1998, techno duo Southern Cross recorded their own version of the track on the single "Running".
 In 2000, German singer Frank Schöbel recorded a version of the song.
 In 2003, Reggae singer John Holt recorded his own version of the song for the compilation album Trojan Christmas Box Set.
 In 2004, Irish singer Tabby Callaghan covered the song on the first series of The X Factor. The following year saw him record the song as the B-Side to his single "Number One".
 In 2009, German musician Frank Zander & German singer Frank Schöbel recorded a version of the song and titled it "Wir Gehören Zusammen". The song was released as a single.

Personnel
Slade
Noddy Holder - lead vocals, guitar
Jim Lea - piano, synthesizer, bass, backing vocals, producer of all B-Sides
Dave Hill - lead guitar, backing vocals
Don Powell - drums

Additional personnel
John Punter - producer of "My Oh My"
Mike Nocito, Pete Schwier - engineers on "My Oh My"
Shoot That Tiger! - design
Pete Turner - photography

References

1983 singles
Slade songs
RCA Records singles
Songs written by Noddy Holder
Songs written by Jim Lea
Number-one singles in Sweden
Number-one singles in Norway
1983 songs
Song recordings produced by John Punter